The bare-bellied hedgehog (Paraechinus nudiventris), also known as the Madras hedgehog, is a species of hedgehog that is endemic to dry arid regions and scrubby jungles in southeastern India. As it was believed to be rare, it was formerly listed as Vulnerable by the IUCN. It is now known to be locally common in the Indian states of Andhra Pradesh and Tamil Nadu, resulting in its new listing as a species of Least Concern. Hedgehogs are protected species under schedule IV of Wildlife Protection Act (1972).

It was also found in Kottayam and Palakkad districts of Kerala.

Madras hedgehogs are hunted locally in India for subsistence food and medicinal purposes. They are wildly perceived to be a cure for tuberculosis and asthma, as well as offer relief against coughs.

Characteristics
It reaches sexual maturity in about 10 months and gives birth to 4-6 young per litter.

See also
Indian hedgehog

References

Cheruvat, Dinesan; Radhakrishnan, C. and Muhamed Jafer Palot. 2006. Handbook on Mammals of Kerala : 1–154. (Published by the Director, ZooL Surv. India, Kolkata)

Pradesh, U. (2016). Medicinal uses and trade of Madras HedgehogsParaechinus nudiventris in Tamil Nadu, India. Traffic Bulletin, 28(1), 7.

bare-bellied hedgehog
Mammals of India
Fauna of Andhra Pradesh
Fauna of Tamil Nadu
bare-bellied hedgehog